Sloatsburg station is a commuter rail stop on the Metro-North Railroad's Port Jervis Line, located in the village of Sloatsburg, New York at the intersection of Municipal Plaza and Mills Street.

Construction of the Sloatsburg station dates back to the 1830s, when the station was built along the Erie Railroad. The station served the line heading to Port Jervis northward, along with a stagecoach to Greenwood Lake three times a day. The station was populated by fishermen on their way to the lake, but has been the site of several accidents. These calamities include a derailed milk train in 1843 and a fatal accident between the train line and several mules and their owner in 1855. The station became part of Metro-North in 1983, when the service was created. The station was listed under a revitalization plan in 2005 to help serve its commuters.

History 

The Erie Railroad was constructed through Sloatsburg from 1836 to 1841, helping with the prosperity of the village, along with its population. The station was also near the Sterlington one, but it never served of great importance. The Sloatsburg station building was built in 1868 as a two-story brick facade with a tin roof. The style of the building, according to the railroad's 1920 engineering report, is a Type 6A style, with dimensions of 17' x 29.5' x 19'. The station was equipped to host as a base for XG Radio from the Suffern Tower (SF) in Suffern. The Sloatsburg station served well for the nearby Greenwood Lake, with a stagecoach leaving the station three times day. The stagecoach was mainly inhabited by fishermen on their way to Greenwood Lake.

The station has been the site of several major accidents involving locomotives. In 1843, the Sloatsburg station was the site of a large accident by train full of milk bottles. On December 31, 1855, the railroad's Cincinnati Express was thrown off the tracks near the Sloatsburg station, when it tried to avoid a countrymen and his four mules, who were crossing the tracks. Three of the mules were killed and mutilated by the train, while the fourth died soon after. There was no damage to the cars or injuries to the passengers. In the early days of August 1856, a girl by the name of McGraff was injured by an oncoming train near the station after carelessly walking onto the tracks. The parents, who were in a poor state financially, was given $45 (1856 USD) in return for their troubles from the Board of Directors in nearby Goshen. On February 21, 1858, a train heading southbound experienced an accident when a brakeman, John Freeland, fell off the train and was run over. Freeland's legs were severed in the incident, and one arm was broken. They hurried Freeland southbound on a nearby train, but died by the time the train reached Paterson, New Jersey towards the hospital.

The station is also close to the original entrance gate to Sloatsburg's Cappamore Farm. The house in the nearby mountainside was built around 1900 as an estate for Nicholas T. Brown, a local alderman from Paterson, New Jersey. This estate and farm gave a panoramic view of the countryside around Sloatsburg. The house was demolished during the construction of the New York State Thruway in 1956. The steel bridge over the Ramapo River and the wooden bridge over Sloat's Millrace were removed as they had become hazardous. Today, all that remains are the stone pillar entranceway, and a walking trail to the nearby Sloat's Dam. The gateposts are listed on the National Register of Historic Places along with the remaining mill and dam structures since they used the same stonework.

In 2005, the Metropolitan Transportation Authority announced plans to renovate the train station. This, along the village's plans to revitalize the entire village of Sloatsburg, was thought to give the bland train station a more traditional look. This would include adding a roof to protect commuters and visitors from the elements, such as rain or snow, handicap-accessible ramps for wheelchairs, better lighting, more seats for people to wait, and a heated shelter. (A shelter exists, but is not heated). The village also wants to use a $50,000 grant from the state to construct a large municipal parking lot near the station. This would get more people to use the station, as because with the lack of facilities, the station is under-used. The preliminary design was made by Jeff Livingston, an architect on the Sloatsburg Revitalization Committee.

Station layout
The station has one track and a short concrete low-level side platform, and is located just south of a grade crossing. The station platform has a shelter and one ticket machine. The station's parking lot, located near a hardware store on Mills Street, has 80 parking spaces. The station is operated by the village of Sloatsburg instead of Metro-North. Connections are available to Transport of Rockland Route 93 and Short Line Bus Routes 17M and 17MD.

Sloatsburg station serves numerous hiking trails in Harriman State Park and Bear Mountain State Park.

References

External links 

 Wikimapia's view of the Sloatsburg station

Metro-North Railroad stations in New York (state)
Railway stations in Rockland County, New York
Former Erie Railroad stations
NJ Transit Rail Operations stations
Railway stations in the United States opened in 1868